Rafael Puente Suárez (born 5 February 1950) is a Mexican former professional footballer and manager. He currently works as an analyst for ESPN Deportes and ESPN Mexico.

Career
Born in Mexico City, Puente began playing football with Mexican Primera División side Atlante F.C. He also played for Club América but was forced to retire following a knee injury.

After he retired from playing, Puente became a football coach. He managed Atlante, C.F. Pachuca and Tecos.

Personal
Puente Jr. also worked as a commentator alongside his father for ESPN before leaving to coach Lobos BUAP.

References

External links
 
 
 
 
 DT Profile at MedioTiempo

1950 births
Living people
Mexico international footballers
Atlante F.C. footballers
Club América footballers
Mexican football managers
Atlante F.C. managers
C.F. Pachuca managers
Tecos F.C. managers
Footballers from Mexico City
Mexican footballers
Liga MX managers
Association football goalkeepers
Liga MX players